The Escuela Nacional Preparatoria (ENP), the oldest senior High School system in Mexico, belonging to the National Autonomous University of Mexico (UNAM), opened its doors on February 1, 1868. It was founded by Gabino Barreda, M.D., following orders of then President of Mexico Benito Juárez. It is also modern UNAM's oldest institution.

This institution's location was the Antiguo Colegio de San Ildefonso, which is located in the heart of Mexico City's historic center. This college was founded in 1588 by the Jesuits and was prestigious during colonial times, but it had almost completely fallen into ruin by the time of the Reform Laws in the 1860s. These Laws secularized most of Church property, including the San Ildefonso College building In 1867, Benito Juárez began reform of the educational system, taking it out of clerical hands and making it a government function. San Ildefonso was converted into the Escuela Nacional Preparatoria initially directed by Gabino Barreda, who organized the new school on the Positivist model of Auguste Comte (Comtism). The initial purpose of the school was to provide the nucleus of students for the soon-to-be-reconstructed Universidad Nacional (National University), later National Autonomous University of Mexico, which was re-established in 1910 by Justo Sierra.

The new preparatory school began functioning at the San Ildefonso building with more than 700 day students and 200 live-in students. The complex remained a separate entity until 1929, when the Universidad Nacional gained autonomy, meaning it became independent of the government, though still government-sponsored. The Preparatory School became part of the newly independent university system, being designated as Preparatory #1 for a short time.

Following this, because of the increasing demand, nine more schools were built, as well as a new organizational organism called General Direction. These schools were located at the center of Mexico City, but due to the increasing size of the city and the necessity for modern buildings, they were relocated in the vicinity of the city, mainly orientated in the southern neighborhoods like Coyoacán, Xochimilco and Villa Coapa.

The original San Ildefonso College location remained open until 1978, when it closed completely. It is now a museum and cultural museum.

Frida Kahlo was one of their many students. She attended the school in 1922.

Orchestra
In 1972, the School's orchestra was founded by Uberto Zanolli.

Its present director is Luis Samuel Saloma, who made a tour along the 9 schools of the ENP, giving a final concert at the Auditorium at the General Direction.

Student exchange
The school runs academic exchanges with different foreign institutions, they are run on a yearly basis.

The Horizon High School in Broomfield, Colorado, United States, has a 10-day exchange plan for 9 students and 2 teachers at School number 3.

City High School at Oklahoma has an exchange of 15 days with School number 9.

Schools
Although the schools all have a name and a number, they are commonly referred to by their numbers rather than by their names.

Curriculum
The school has mainly 2 kinds of study plan:

 Iniciación Universitaria: Is only run at School 2, and it consists in 6 years, which covers Mexican Secondary and Preparatory School, the second half of it, is identical to all the other Schools plan.
 High School. It lasts for 3 years and is the main plan in all 9 schools. Last year is divided in 4 specialization areas: Physics, Mathematics and Engineering/ Biology and Health Sciences/Social Sciences/ Arts and Humanities.

Former general directors
 Gabino Barreda (1868–1878)
 Miguel E. Schultz (1904–1905)
 José Vasconcelos (1919)
 Ezequiel A. Chávez (1920–1921)
 Alfonso Caso Andrade - (1928–1930)
 Moisés Hurtado González (1970)
 Guadalupe Gorostieta y Cadena (1982–1986)
 Ernesto Schettino Maimone (1986–1994)
 José Luis Balmaceda Becerra (1994–1998)
 Héctor Enrique Herrera León y Vélez (1998–2006)
 María de Lourdes Sánchez Obregón (2006-2010)
 Silvia Jurado Cuéllar (2010 - Currently in Office)

References

Bibliography 
 “Alumnos de la UNAM, carne de cañon de aspirantes presidenciales”, DEMOS, Desarrollo de Medios, S.A. de C.V, México, November 13, 2005
 “Continuaran protestas de estudiantes”, DEMOS, Desarrollo de Medios, S.A. de C.V, México, November 21, 2005
 "Solucion en Preparatoria 5 y 6”, DEMOS, Desarrollo de Medios, S.A. de C.V, México, November 23, 2005
 Revista Vértigo, año V No. 245 / November 27, 2005, Julio Derbéz  del Pino pp. 26–28.

External links
 Sistema Escolar de Calificaciones
 Gaceta ENP 

Educational institutions established in 1868
National Autonomous University of Mexico
High schools in Mexico
Boarding schools in Mexico
1868 establishments in Mexico